MyTalk was a Fairfax Media television channel available to viewers of digital television in Australia. The datacast channel, launched on 13 April 2007, was designed to supplement the Southern Cross Ten and Southern Cross Television digital television services and the online portal. The channel was also localised for thirty markets to include international, national and local news, as well as weather updates.

History
MyTalk began transmissions on 11 April 2007. On 13 April 2007, the datacast channel began operations.

In 2007, Fairfax Media bought the radio assets of Southern Cross Broadcasting including MyTalk. Macquarie Media Group purchased Southern Cross for A$1.35 billion and onsold these assets to the Fairfax Group. Following this on 25 February 2008, MyTalk ceased broadcasting. Became local 576pProgrames from 25 February 2008, .

Features
MyTalk featured a twenty-four-hour television guide for the programming of Southern Cross Ten or Southern Cross Television that was localised for each broadcast market. The channel provided realtime news twenty-four hours a day, which included local, national, and international news, as well as current affairs. MyTalk also provided realtime local weather reports.

A live video preview of promotions for programming on Southern Cross Ten or Southern Cross Television was available on MyTalk. The live preview also rebroadcast regional current affairs program, State Focus. The live video preview was accompanied by a Now and Next television guide. MyTalk advertised television programs from Southern Cross Ten or Southern Cross Television via a small billboard loop. The advertising also contained billboards of the online portals features, as well as current and upcoming promotions.

Availability

MyTalk was broadcast in 576i standard definition, in Regional Queensland, Regional New South Wales, Regional Victoria, Tasmania, and Darwin. The channel was carried via Southern Cross Television and Southern Cross Ten owned-and-operated stations, these included GLV Eastern Victoria, BCV Western Victoria, CTC Southern New South Wales, NRN Northern New South Wales, TNQ Queensland, TNT Tasmania, TND Darwin, SGS Spencer Gulf and SCN Broken Hill. Southern Cross Broadcasting announced its intention to provide MyTalk via Nine Adelaide, however after selling the station to the WIN Corporation these plans were ceased.

Identity

MyTalks' on-air look was constant since April 2007, when the channel launched. The datacast channel featured a Yellow and White theme. The channel also features a small 4:3 ratio video feed at the top right of the screen. The on-air identity of MyTalk was consistent with its online portal.

See also
 Fairfax Media
 Nine Network

References

Television channels and stations established in 2007
Television channels and stations disestablished in 2008
Defunct television channels in Australia
Digital terrestrial television in Australia
Web portals
Internet properties established in 2007
Internet properties disestablished in 2008
2007 establishments in Australia
2008 disestablishments in Australia